Mike Laschev (born August 20, 1953) is a retired Soviet-American soccer forward who played professionally in the American Soccer League and Major Indoor Soccer League.

In 1981, he played for the Rochester Flash of the American Soccer League.  In the fall of 1980, Laschev signed with the Buffalo Stallions of Major Indoor Soccer League.  In 1982, he became a U.S. citizen.  He spent three seasons with the Stallions before moving to the Chicago Sting in 1984.   In the fall of 1985, the Sting sold Laschev's contract to the Baltimore Blast.  He spent one season in Baltimore, then left the league.

References

External links
 MISL stats

1953 births
Living people
American Soccer League (1933–1983) players
Baltimore Blast (1980–1992) players
Buffalo Stallions players
Chicago Sting (MISL) players
Major Indoor Soccer League (1978–1992) players
Rochester Flash players
Soviet footballers
Soviet expatriate footballers
Ukrainian footballers
Ukrainian expatriate footballers
Expatriate soccer players in the United States
Sportspeople from Lviv
Ukrainian SSR emigrants to the United States
Association football forwards